Kooman is a surname. Notable people with the surname include:

 Kooman, 2022 Indian film
 Andrew Kooman (21st century), Canadian playwright
 Michael Kooman (21st century), American composer

See also
 Koopman